A quantum telescope is an idea for a telescope aimed at beating the diffraction limit of space telescopes by exploiting some properties of quantum mechanics, such as entanglement and photon cloning.

References

Proposed telescopes
Telescope types